E 871 is a European B class road in Bulgaria and North Macedonia, connecting the Kazanluk in Bulgaria and the city of Kumanovo in North Macedonia.

Route
 
 : Kazanluk - Karlovo - Pirdop - Zlatitsa - Gorni Bogrov
 : Gorni Bogrov - Sofia
 : Sofia
 : Sofia - Pernik - Radomir - Kyustendil
 : Kyustendil - Garlyano - / border crossing

 
: Uzem - Kriva Palanka - Ginovtsi - Rankovtse - Mlado Nagorichane - Kumanovo

See also
Roads in Bulgaria
Highways in Bulgaria

External links 
 UN Economic Commission for Europe: Overall Map of E-road Network (2007)

International E-road network
Roads in Bulgaria
Pan-European Corridor VIII